The Hillsong Church started in Australia and from there spread as a Pentecostal movement. Since they started releasing recordings in 1992, they have published and recorded hundreds of songs on over 50 albums, mostly under their own label, Hillsong Music.

Below is a list of songs arranged alphabetically by title. Italicised song titles indicate an instrumental recording. Italicised album names indicate an instrumental album. A number in brackets after the song title means that there have been different songs with the same name. If a particular song is on more than one album, all albums are listed alphabetically. A number in brackets after the album name indicates the version number of that song in chronological order. If they are the same number, it means they are the same recording.

Note: Songs from the (non-English) Hillsong Ukraine albums are not listed.

A

B

C

D

E

F

G

H
{| class="wikitable"
|-
! Title !! Author !! Album !! Track
|-
|He Shall Reign
|Ben Fielding, Reuben Morgan
|Awake
|12
|-
| Hallelujah (1) || Darlene Zschech || Christmas || 13
|-
| rowspan="2" | Hallelujah (2) || rowspan="2" | Marty SampsonJonas Myrin || For All You've Done (1) || 6 (CD 1)
|-
| Ultimate Collection Volume II (1) || 7
|-
| Hallelujah (3) || Matt TennikoffRolf Wam FjellMarty Sampson || United We Stand || 17
|-
| rowspan="2" | Hark the Herald Angels Sing || rowspan="2" | traditional; arranged by:  Peter King  / Luke-Henri Peipman  Steve McPherson || Celebrating Christmas (2) || 8
|-
| Christmas || 2
|-
| Have Faith in God || Geoff Bullock || People Just Like Us || 7
|-
| rowspan="3" | Have Your Way || rowspan="3" | Darlene Zschech || Extravagant Worship: The Songs of Darlene Zschech (1) || 5 (CD 2)
|-
| Simply Worship 3 (1) || 5
|-
| The Secret Place (2) || 1
|-
| He Is Lord || Ben Fielding || This Is Our God || 5
|-
| rowspan="2" | He Shall Be Called || rowspan="2" | Russell Fragar || Friends in High Places (1) || 2
|-
| Hills Praise (1) || 13
|-
| Healer || Michael Guglielmucci || This Is Our God || 7
|-
| Hear Me Calling || Geoff Bullock || The Power of Your Love || 7
|-
| Heartbeats || Ben Tennikoff  Joel Houston  Matt Crocker  Michael Guy Chislett || Zion (Deluxe Edition) || 10
|-
| rowspan="2" | Heart Like Heaven || rowspan="2" | Matt Crocker  Joel Houston || Empires || 3
|-
| Open Heaven / River Wild || 7
|-
| rowspan="4" | Hear Our Praises || rowspan="4" | Reuben Morgan || Extravagant Worship: The Songs of Reuben Morgan (2) || 1 (CD 1)
|-
| Touching Heaven Changing Earth (1) || 2
|-
| Shout to the Lord 2000 (2) || 16
|-
| The Platinum Collection Volume 1: Shout to the Lord (2) || 15 (CD 1)
|-
| rowspan="2" | Hear Our Prayer || rowspan="2" | Tanya Riches || Overwhelmed (2) || 2
|-
| Everyday (1) || 8
|-
| rowspan="3" | Heaven || rowspan="3" | Reuben Morgan || Extravagant Worship: The Songs of Reuben Morgan (2) || 8 (CD 1)
|-
| Simply Worship 3 (1) || 8
|-
| Everyday (2) || 5
|-
| Heaven and Earth (Live) || Ben Fielding and Sam Kncock || No Other Name || 2
|-
| Heaven in My Heart || David Wakerley  Beci Wakerley || Super Strong God || 8
|-
| Here I Am (Father's Love) || Jonas Myrin  Natasha Bedingfield || Shout God's Fame || 9
|-
| rowspan="2" | Here I Am to Worship  / Call || rowspan="2" | Tim Hughes  / Darlene Zschech || Hope (1) || 10 (CD 1)
|-
| Ultimate Worship || 8
|-
| Here in My Life || Mia Fieldes || Saviour King || 12
|-
| rowspan="2" | Here Now (Madness) || rowspan="2" | Joel Houston  Michael Guy Chislett || Empires || 1
|-
| Open Heaven / River Wild (Deluxe Edition) || 13
|-
| Here to Eternity || Darlene Zschech  David Moyse || For This Cause || 9
|-
| Here With You || Jamie Snell  Johannes Shore  Joshua Grimmett || Open Heaven / River Wild || 9
|-
| rowspan="3" | He's Real || rowspan="3" | Russell Fragar || Hills Praise (1) || 3
|-
| Shout to the Lord (1) || 8
|-
| The Platinum Collection Volume 1: Shout to the Lord (1) || 2 (CD 1)
|-
| High and Lifted Up || Darlene Zschech  Mike Guglielmucci || This Is Our God || 6
|-
| Higher  / I Believe in You || Mia Fieldes  / Darlene Zschech || Mighty to Save || 13
|-
| rowspan="3" | Highest || rowspan="3" | Reuben Morgan || Hope (1) || 11 (CD 1)
|-
| Hope (2) || 7 (CD 2)
|-
| Ultimate Worship (1) || 15
|-
| His Glory Appears || Brooke Fraser || Faith + Hope + Love || 10
|-
| His Love || Raymond Badham || God He Reigns || 3 (CD 1)
|-
| rowspan="2" | History Maker || rowspan="2" | Martin Smith || UP: Unified Praise || 11
|-
| Shout God's Fame || 8
|-
| Holding On || Geoff Bullock || Friends in High Places || 9
|-
| Holy One of God || Geoff Bullock || Stone's Been Rolled Away || 7
|-
| Holy Spirit Come || Geoff Bullock || Stone's Been Rolled Away || 6
|-
| rowspan="4" | Holy Spirit Rain Down || rowspan="4" | Russell Fragar || Simply Worship 3 (1) || 1
|-
| The Platinum Collection Volume 1: Shout to the Lord (1) || 13 (CD 2)
|-
| The Secret Place (2) || 9
|-
| Touching Heaven Changing Earth (1) || 5
|-
| Holy Spirit Rise || Geoff Bullock || The Power of Your Love || 13
|-
| Holy, Holy, Holy || traditional arranged by:  Reuben MorganPeter King || King of Majesty || 10
|-
| Home || Marty Sampson || For All You've Done || 8 (CD 1)
|-
| Hope of The World || rowspan="2" | Reuben Morgan  Jason Ingram  Matthew Bronleewee || rowspan="2" | Cornerstone || 5
|-
| Hope of The World (Studio Version) || 13
|-
| Hosanna (1) || Stuart Garrard  Peter Wilson || Jesus Is || 6
|-
| rowspan="2" | Hosanna (2) || rowspan="2" | Brooke Fraser || All of the Above (1) || 8
|-
| Saviour King || 11
|-
| How Can You Refuse Him Now? || Hank Williams || Songs for Communion || 14
|-
| rowspan="2" | How Great Is Our God || rowspan="2" | Chris Tomlin  Jesse Reeves  Ed Cash || Jesus Is (1) || 13
|-
| Jesus Is: Remix (2) || 10
|-
| How I Long for You || Marty Sampson || Faithful || 11
|}

I

J

K

L

M

N

O

P

Q
No songs begin with 'Q'

R

S

T

U

V
No songs start with ‘V’.  

W

XNo song titles begin with X.Y

Z

Note
Nameless, instrumental-only tracks such as introductions are not listed. These include:
 People Just Like Us: track 1
 To the Ends of the Earth: track 1
 United We Stand: tracks 1, 7, 9 and 16 (labelled as Selah, Hebrew for 'pause' or 'reflection')
 Aftermath'': track 6

See also
 Hillsong Church
 Hillsong musicians
 List of Hillsong albums

Songs
Hillsong